Daylan Kandi (also Romanized as Dāylān Kandī) is a village in Zangebar Rural District, in the Central District of Poldasht County, West Azerbaijan Province, Iran. At the 2006 census, its population was 965, in 180 families.

References 

Populated places in Poldasht County